Hummer Badlands is a racing game developed by Eutechnyx and published by Global Star Software. It was released in North America for the PlayStation 2 on April 13, 2006, and for Xbox the next day. The game involves off-road racing in a Hummer vehicle.

Gameplay
There are seven different types of races.

Reception

The game received "generally unfavorable reviews" on both platforms according to video game review aggregator Metacritic.

References

External links
 

2006 video games
PlayStation 2 games
Xbox games
Racing video games
Eutechnyx games
Video games developed in the United Kingdom
Take-Two Interactive games
Global Star Software games
Multiplayer and single-player video games